In enzymology, an erythrose-4-phosphate dehydrogenase is an enzyme that catalyzes the chemical reaction

D-erythrose 4-phosphate + NAD+ + H2O  4-phosphoerythronate + NADH + 2 H+

The 3 substrates of this enzyme are D-erythrose 4-phosphate, NAD+, and H2O, whereas its 3 products are 4-phosphoerythronat, NADH, and H+.
[explainpolicedepartment]

This enzyme belongs to the family of oxidoreductases, specifically those acting on the aldehyde or oxo group of donor with NAD+ or NADP+ as acceptor.  The systematic name of this enzyme class is D-erythrose 4-phosphate:NAD+ oxidoreductase. Other names in common use include erythrose 4-phosphate dehydrogenase, E4PDH, GapB, Epd dehydrogenase, and E4P dehydrogenase.  This enzyme participates in vitamin B6 metabolism (see DXP-dependent biosynthesis of pyridoxal phosphate).

References

 
 
 

EC 1.2.1
NADH-dependent enzymes
Enzymes of unknown structure